Afrasura obliterata is a moth of the  subfamily Arctiinae. It is found in Angola, Cameroon, Chad, the Republic of Congo, the Democratic Republic of Congo, Gabon, Ghana, Kenya, Nigeria, Sierra Leone, South Africa, Togo and Uganda.

References

obliterata
Moths of Africa
Moths described in 1865